The Donald Bren Events Center, commonly known as the Bren Events Center or simply the Bren, is a 5,608-seat indoor arena on the campus of the University of California, Irvine, in Irvine, California, United States.

Construction and history
It was conceived and planned in 1981, with the passage of a student referendum authorizing an assessment of $23 per student per quarter as of winter 1987. It opened January 8, 1987, with UCI men's basketball vs. Utah State. Parkin Architects Limited served as the architects for the building, which was renamed "Donald Bren Events Center" in 1988.  The University of California, Irvine renamed the structure in honor of real estate mogul and chairman of the Irvine Company, Donald Bren, upon receipt of a $1.5 million donation.

Amenities
It is a 65,000 assignable (90,000 gross) square-foot multi-purpose facility servicing the university and all of southern California. It features a  arena which hosts UCI Anteater Basketball, volleyball and serves as a general assembly space for special events. Additional conference and meeting spaces are available to support arena events and to host small meetings. In addition, it provides:

An arena of approximately 21,300 ASF that accommodates intercollegiate regulation basketball.
An arena that can be converted into three courts for recreational use for basketball and volleyball.
An arena with seating of 4,984 for spectator sporting events and 5,710 for concerts, lectures and conventions .
The Koll Room, a multi-purpose room of 1,820 ASF on the arena level to accommodate meetings, receptions, and instruction.
The Stewart Room, a room of 1,600 ASF suitable for receptions for 150 and banquet seating for 60.
The Berry Family Terrace, an outdoor terrace of 4,480 ASF suitable for intermission and pre- or post event receptions.

Tenants

Athletics
It serves as the home to UC Irvine Anteaters athletic programs. Men's basketball, women's basketball, and men's volleyball all play their home games at Bren.

The facility was home to the 1990, 1991 and 1992 U.S. Open Badminton Championships.

Other events
It is also used for concerts, trade fairs, conventions, Broadway shows and graduation ceremonies.

Recent examples of usage include hosting Tenzin Gyatso, the 14th Dalai Lama, when he spoke in 2004, while Jimmy Carter spoke and answered questions about his book Palestine: Peace Not Apartheid on 3 May 2007. Bill Clinton spoke at a campaign rally for local Democratic candidates in 2012.

The university's Filipino cultural organization, Kababayan, hosts their annual Pilipinx American Cultural Night, abbreviated to PACN, at the Bren. It is the largest Filipino cultural performance in the state.

TNA Wrestling also held its 2009 Bound For Glory Event here.

Blink-182 headlined a sold-out show at the Bren in 1999.

See also
List of convention centers in the United States
List of NCAA Division I basketball arenas
Crawford Hall

References

External links
Bren Events Center

Badminton venues
Basketball venues in California
Volleyball venues in California
College basketball venues in the United States
College volleyball venues in the United States
Convention centers in California
Indoor arenas in California
Music venues in California
Sports venues in Irvine, California
Sports venues completed in 1987
UC Irvine Anteaters men's basketball
UC Irvine Anteaters women's basketball
UC Irvine Anteaters men's volleyball
University of California, Irvine main campus buildings and structures
Event venues established in 1987
1987 establishments in California